Juve the Great is the sixth studio album by American rapper Juvenile. The album was released on December 23, 2003, by Cash Money Records, Universal Music Group and UTP Records. It was Juvenile's last album on the Cash Money label. The album was certified platinum July 20, 2004, becoming his third album to do so, after 400 Degreez and Tha G-Code. 

Juve the Great includes the hit single "Slow Motion" featuring Soulja Slim, who was shot dead almost a month before the album's release, which topped the Billboard Hot 100. It became the most successful single for both artists and made Soulja Slim one of the only artists to top the charts posthumously.

Track listing
Credits adapted from the album's liner notes.

Sample credits
 "Bounce Back" contains elements of "Why Have I Lost You", written by Larry Blackmon, and performed by Cameo.

Charts

Weekly charts

Year-end charts

Certifications

References

2003 albums
Juvenile (rapper) albums
Cash Money Records albums
Albums produced by Mannie Fresh